Ed Ta'amu (born November 8, 1979) is a former arena football offensive lineman. He was originally drafted by the Minnesota Vikings in the fourth round (132nd overall) of the 2002 NFL Draft. He played college football at Utah.

Ta'amu played for the Minnesota Vikings, Houston Texans, Spokane Shock and Kansas City Brigade.

As a rookie in the National Football League in 2002, he was one of 28 Samoan players in the league. As well, as of October 4, 2008, he was one of 16 Polynesian players in the Arena Football League.

High school career
Ta'amu attended Iolani School where he was an All-America Honorable Menchin as a senior in 1997.

College career
Ta'amu attended the University of Utah, where he was a two-year starter. Ta'amu was an academic non-qualifier in 1997, meaning he did not have the grades to play football. He joined the team in 1998, as a backup defensive end, as well as backup long snapper. On the season, he recorded three tackles. In 1999, he was a backup defensive tackle, a position where he did not receive much playing time, so in turn, he was switched to offensive line. In 2000, he started all but one game.

Career summary
Ta'amu was a two-time All-Mountain West Conference selection. He recorded 123 knockdowns blocks, including a school record 25 against Brigham Young during his senior season.

Ta'amu was graded at 86.8% for blocking consistency and played in 20 of 26 games during his final two seasons. He also set new school weight room records with a 625-pound squat and 412-pound hang clean. As a senior, he also bench pressed 455 pounds. He was also selected to the All-Mountain West Conference Second-team, as well as a First-team selection by the Las Vegas Review-Journal and Collegefootballnews.com.

Professional career

Pre-draft
Ta'amu received an invitation to the 2002 NFL Scouting Combine. He was rated as the sixth best guard out of 43. He was projected to be drafted in the third to fourth round of the draft.

National Football League
Ta'amu was selected in the fourth round (132nd overall) of the 2002 NFL Draft by the Minnesota Vikings on April 21, and was signed on July 17. However, he suffered a knee injury and was waived by the team on September 2, 2002. The next day, he was signed to the Vikings practice squad. Then on October 16, he was placed on the practice squad's injured reserve, ending his season. He was then signed by the Houston Texans on January 8. He was later placed on the Physically Unable to Perform (PUP) list on July 25. He was then waived by the Texans on September 2, 2003.

af2
He spent the next two years rehabbing his knee before being able to compete in a full season of professional football for the Spokane Shock of af2, in 2006. He played alongside future Kansas City Brigade teammates Charles Frederick, Jerome Stevens, Chris Cook, and Neil Purvis. That season, the Shock won ArenaCup III.

Arena Football League
On January 5, 2007 Ta'amu signed with the Kansas City Brigade of the Arena Football League. However, when the AFL folded, he became a free agent and now plays for the Spokane Shock

Kansas City Brigade
As a rookie in 2007, he began the season on injured reserve. He then started the final four games of the season, including the first ever playoff game in franchise history. In 2008, he recorded three tackles. After the season, he was released by the Brigade.

Spokane Shock
After a year of waiting, the AFL was reformed and when the Spokane Shock became part of the revamped AFL, Ta'amu was once again signed by Spokane in the off season and is on the active roster.

Personal life
In 2002, Ta'amu was one of 28 Samoan players in the National Football League, the most notable being Tiaina "Junior" Seau. As of October 4, 2008, Ta'amu was one of 16 Polynesian players in the Arena Football League.

See also
 List of Arena Football League and National Football League players

Notes

External links
 Kansas City Brigade bio
 Utah Utes bio
 Bio at ArenaFootball.com

1979 births
Living people
American sportspeople of Samoan descent
American football defensive linemen
American football offensive linemen
Utah Utes football players
Minnesota Vikings players
Houston Texans players
Kansas City Brigade players
Spokane Shock players
Players of American football from Honolulu
Portland Thunder players
Utah Blaze players
Los Angeles Kiss players